So Fresh: The Hits of Spring 2005  is a compilation of songs that were popular in Australia in spring 2005. It was released on 18 September 2005.

Track listing 
 2Pac featuring Elton John – "Ghetto Gospel" (3:59)
 Akon – "Lonely" (3:34)
 Backstreet Boys – "Incomplete" (3:59)
 The Black Eyed Peas – "Don't Phunk with My Heart" (4:00)
 Gwen Stefani – "Hollaback Girl" (3:20)
 Mario – "Here I Go Again" (3:21)
Amerie – "1 Thing" (4:00)
 Nelly – "'N' Dey Say" (3:27)
 Kelly Clarkson – "Behind These Hazel Eyes" (3:16)
 Delta Goodrem – "A Little Too Late" (3:27)
 Anthony Callea – "Hurts So Bad" (3:03)
 Random – "Put Your Hands Up" (3:27)
 Eminem – "Mockingbird" (4:11)
 Kanye West – "Diamonds from Sierra Leone" (4:00)
 Martin Solveig – "Everybody" (4:16)
 Freemasons featuring Amanda Wilson – "Love on My Mind" (3:00)
 Jem – "They" (3:15)
 Tammin – "It's a Beautiful Thing" (3:15)
 The Killers – "All These Things That I've Done" (3:49)
 Schnappi – "Schnappi, das kleine Krokodil" (2:10)

Charts

See also
So Fresh

References

External links
 Official site

So Fresh albums
2005 compilation albums
2005 in Australian music